Josée Marsolais (born 20 December 1973) is a Canadian water polo player. She competed in the women's tournament at the 2000 Summer Olympics.

See also
 Canada women's Olympic water polo team records and statistics
 List of women's Olympic water polo tournament goalkeepers
 List of World Aquatics Championships medalists in water polo

References

External links
 

1973 births
Living people
Sportspeople from Laval, Quebec
Canadian female water polo players
Water polo goalkeepers
Olympic water polo players of Canada
Water polo players at the 2000 Summer Olympics
Water polo people from Quebec